The Swiss national under-20 football team is the national under-20 football team of Switzerland controlled by Swiss Football Association.

Competitive record

FIFA U-20 World Cup Record

Swiss national teams
 Switzerland national football team
 Switzerland national under-23 football team (also known as Swiss Olympic)
 Switzerland national under-21 football team
 Switzerland national under-19 football team
 Switzerland national under-18 football team
 Switzerland national under-17 football team
 Switzerland national under-16 football team

External links
 SFV U-20 National Team

European national under-20 association football teams
F